The Historic Centre of Sighișoara (Sighișoara Citadel) is the old historic center of the town of Sighișoara, Romania, built in the 12th century by Saxon settlers. It is an inhabited medieval citadel that, in 1999, was designated a UNESCO World Heritage Site for its 850-year-old testament to the history and culture of the Transylvanian Saxons.

Birthplace of Vlad III the Impaler (in Romanian Vlad Țepeș), Sighișoara hosts, every year, a medieval festival where arts and crafts blend with rock music and stage plays. The city marks the upper boundary of the Land of Sachsen. Like its bigger brothers, Sibiu (Hermannstadt) and Braşov (Kronstadt), Sighișoara exhibits Medieval German architectural and cultural heritage that was preserved even during the Communist period.

See also
 List of World Heritage Sites in Romania

External links

World Heritage Site

Sighișoara
Buildings and structures in Mureș County
Tourist attractions in Mureș County
World Heritage Sites in Romania